John Manners, 2nd Duke of Rutland KG (18 September 1676 – 22 February 1721), styled Lord Roos from 1679 to 1703 and Marquess of Granby from 1703 to 1711, was a British Whig politician sat in the English and British House of Commons from 1701 until 1711, when he succeeded to the peerage as Duke of Rutland.

Early life
Manners was the son of John Manners, 1st Duke of Rutland and his third wife Catherine Wriothesley Noel, daughter of Baptist Noel, 3rd Viscount Campden.

Career
Manners was returned as a Whig Member of Parliament for Derbyshire at the first general election of  1701. He was returned as MP for  Leicestershire at the second general election of 1701. At the 1705 English general election he was returned as MP for Grantham. He was a Commissioner for the Union with Scotland in 1706. He was returned again as MP for Grantham at the 1708 British general election. At the 1710 British general election, he was returned as MP for both Leicestershire and Grantham. He succeeded his father as Duke of Rutland on 10 January 1711 and vacated his seats in the house of Commons, having not chosen which he would choose. He was Lord Lieutenant of Rutland from 1712 to 1715 and Lord Lieutenant of Leicestershire from 1714 to 1721. In 1714, he was made a Knight of the Garter.

Legacy
Manners married, firstly, Catherine Russell, daughter of William Russell, Lord Russell and Lady Rachel Wriothesley, on 23 August 1693. They had nine children:

John Manners, 3rd Duke of Rutland (1696–1779), who married Hon. Bridget Sutton and had children
Lord William Manners (1697–1772), who married Corbetta Smyth and had children
Lord Edward Manners
Lord Thomas Manners (died 1723)
Lord Wriothesley Manners
Lady Catherine Manners (died 18 February 1780), who married on 29 October 1726 Henry Pelham and had children.
Lady Elizabeth Manners (1709 – 22 March 1730), who married John Monckton, 1st Viscount Galway, and had children.
Lady Rachel Manners (died c. 1723)
Lady Frances Manners, who married Hon. Richard Arundell, son of John Arundell, 2nd Baron Arundell of Trerice.

Manners succeeded his father as Duke of Rutland on 10 January 1711. A few months later, his wife Catherine died.

He married, secondly, Lucy Sherard, daughter of Bennet Sherard, 2nd Baron Sherard, on 1 January 1713. Their children included:

Lord Sherard Manners (c. 1713 – 13 January 1742), who became MP for Tavistock
Lord James Manners (1720 – 1 November 1790)
Lord George Manners (d. December 1721)
Lady Caroline Manners (d. 10 November 1769), who married on 2 October 1734 Sir Henry Harpur, 5th Baronet (d. 1748), by whom she had children; she married secondly, on 17 July 1753, Sir Robert Burdett, 4th Baronet (d. 1797).
Lady Lucy Manners (c. 1717 – 18 June 1788), who married on 28 October 1742, in London, William Graham, 2nd Duke of Montrose and had children.
Lord Robert Manners (c. 1721 – 31 May 1782), who married on 1 January 1756 Mary Digges and had children
Lord Henry Manners (d. 1745)
Lord Charles Manners (d. 1761)

References

1676 births
1721 deaths
102
Knights of the Garter
Lord-Lieutenants of Leicestershire
Granby, John Manners, Marquess of
J
English MPs 1701
English MPs 1701–1702
English MPs 1705–1707
British MPs 1707–1708
British MPs 1708–1710
British MPs 1710–1713
J